Cycas panzhihuaensis is a rare and vulnerable species of cycad known in the wild only from Sichuan and Yunnan provinces in China. It can be seen at the South China Botanical Garden in Guangzhou and is also cultivated for horticulture, where it is often known as the Dukou sago palm. In Europe in Iturraran Parco Natural, Guipuzcoa, Spain.

Range
In China, Cycas panzhihuaensis is found in:

Sichuan province: Ningnan County and Panzhihua [Dukou 渡口] (Baguan River and Jinsha River area)
Yunnan province: Huaping County and Yuanmou County. Populations in Luquan County are shrinking.

Description
The species is similar to C. pectinata Buchanan-Hamilton but can be distinguished by its unbranched trunk and smaller seeds (up to 3.5 cm long).

Cycas panzhihuaensis L. Zhou & S. Y. Yang in L. Zhou et al., Acta Phytotax. Sin. 19: 335. 1981.

References

panzhihuaensis
Endemic flora of China
Flora of Yunnan
Flora of Sichuan
Vulnerable flora of Asia
Plants described in 1981